FWI may refer to:
 Air Caraïbes, an airline of the French Caribbean
 Future Work Index
 Fatalities and weighted injuries
 Forest fire weather index
 French West Indies